Sibley Memorial Hospital is a non-profit hospital located in The Palisades neighborhood of Washington, D.C. It is fully accredited by the Joint Commission on Accreditation of Healthcare Organizations, and is licensed by the District of Columbia Department of Health and Human Services. The hospital specializes in surgery, orthopedics, and oncology services. It has been part of Johns Hopkins Medicine since 2010.

U.S. News & World Report 
Sibley is ranked #6 in the Washington, D.C. metro area. In adult specialties, Sibley was noted as High-Performing in orthopedics and nephrology.

Patient safety 

Sibley Memorial Hospital has a B grade "Hospital Safety Score" by The Leapfrog Group as of Fall 2018 and has the highest grade in Washington, D.C.

Departments 

The main phone number for Sibley Memorial Hospital is 202-537-4000.
 Admissions 
 Anesthesia
 Assisted Living at Grand Oaks
 Bariatric Surgery
 Behavioral Health
 Blood Bank
 Breast Center
 Cancer Center
 Cardiovascular Services
 Chaplain/Pastoral Care
 Childbirth Education
 Clinical Trials
 Cosmetic Surgery
 Diabetes Education
 Emergency Department
 Endoscopy
 Gynecologic Oncology and Surgery
 Home Health
 Imaging Services (Radiology)
 Infusion Services
 Intensive Care
 Labor and Delivery
 Laboratory
 Maternal Fetal Medicine
 Medical Oncology
 Nursing
 Nutrition Services
 Pain Center
 Pathology
 Pharmacy
 Psychiatry
 Radiation Oncology
 Rehabilitation Medicine
 Sleep Center
 Surgery Center
 Urology
 Volunteer Service
 Weight Loss Surgery

See also
Lucy Webb Hayes National Training School

References

External links 
 Sibley Memorial Hospital
 Johns Hopkins Medicine Patient Care Locations

Hospital buildings completed in 1890
Hospitals in Washington, D.C.
1890 establishments in Washington, D.C.
Johns Hopkins Medical Institutions
The Palisades (Washington, D.C.)